RJ Rockers Brewing Company is a beer brewing company based in Spartanburg, South Carolina, founded in 1997 by current owner/brewer, Mark R. Johnsen.  The company is considered a microbrewery meaning it has an annual production of less than 15,000 barrels.

History
The company began as a brewpub on Morgan Square in downtown Spartanburg, but in 2002 Johnsen decided to leave the restaurant business and concentrate solely on producing craft beer.  Johnsen soon relocated his 10 barrel brewing system to a Spartanburg industrial park off of the Interstate 85 Business Loop.  This location reached full capacity after the company experienced 92% growth in 2008, and in February 2009 RJ Rockers Brewing Company leased a building in downtown Spartanburg's west end that was formerly occupied by The Salvation Army.  The  facility features a 30 barrel brewing system with an annual capacity of 18,000 barrels.

Beers produced 
RJ Rockers Brewing Company sells its beer in bottles, cans, and on draft.  Annually, RJ Rockers releases 11 beers in bottles but produces many more that are draft only "specialty brews".  In February 2015, RJ Rockers released its first barrel aged beer (BA Black Perle), thus beginning a series of beers that have been aged in Whiskey, Bourbon, Pinot Noir, and Rum Barrels from various vineyards and distilleries across the U.S. and the U.S. Virgin Islands.  To date, bottles from the Barrel Aged Series are only sold at the downtown Spartanburg brewery.

Given Johnsen's service in the US Army as a Ranger, several of the original beers by RJ Rockers carry patriotic names, i.e. Bald Eagle Brown Ale, Patriot Pale Ale and Star Spangled Stout.  While some names have changed over time, RJ Rockers' patriotic nature remains.

Locations sold 
RJ Rockers currently has distribution in South Carolina, North Carolina, Georgia, Tennessee, Virginia, West Virginia, Maryland and Washington DC.

See also
 Barrel-aged beer

References

External links
company website

Beer brewing companies based in South Carolina
Companies based in South Carolina
Companies based in Spartanburg, South Carolina